Allen Zelmo Battle (born November 29, 1968) is an American former professional baseball outfielder. He played in Major League Baseball (MLB) for the St. Louis Cardinals and Oakland Athletics. He was drafted by the Cardinals in the 10th round of the 1991 MLB draft. Battle played his first professional season with their Rookie league Johnson City Cardinals and Class A Savannah Cardinals in 1991, and his last with the Chicago Cubs' Rookie league AZL Cubs and Triple-A Iowa Cubs in 1999.

References

External links

1968 births
Living people
African-American baseball players
American expatriate baseball players in Canada
American expatriate baseball players in Mexico
Arizona League Cubs players
Arkansas Travelers players
Baseball players from North Carolina
Edmonton Trappers players
Iowa Cubs players
Johnson City Cardinals players
Louisville Redbirds players
Major League Baseball outfielders
Nashville Sounds players
Oakland Athletics players
Ottawa Lynx players
People from Wayne County, North Carolina
Saraperos de Saltillo players
Savannah Cardinals players
South Alabama Jaguars baseball players
Springfield Cardinals players
St. Louis Cardinals players
St. Petersburg Cardinals players
21st-century African-American people
20th-century African-American sportspeople